Greece will compete at the 2022 European Athletics Championships in Munich, Germany, between 15 and 21 August 2022 with 40 athletes.

Medals

Results

Men
Track & road events

Field events

Women
Track & road events

Field events

Key
Q = Qualified for the next round
q = Qualified for the next round as a fastest loser or, in field events, by position without achieving the qualifying target
NR = National record
N/A = Round not applicable for the event
Bye = Athlete not required to compete in round

References

European Athletics Championships
2022
Nations at the 2022 European Athletics Championships